Eva Björg Ægisdóttir is an Icelandic writer. 

She was born in Akranes in 1988. Her literary aspirations were apparent from an early age, when she won a short-story competition at the age of 15. She went to Norway for higher studies, and upon returning to Iceland, decided to write a novel. Her first book The Creak on the Stairs (2018) was a No.1 bestseller in Iceland and won the Icelandic Svart Fuglinn (engl.:Blackbird Award). The same novel won the British literary award New Blood Dagger in 2021.

The novel's success also was her international breakthrough:her crime novels have got licensed translations in English, French, German and Polish.

Subsequent books in her Forbidden Iceland series include Girls Who Lie and Night Shadows. 

She is published in English translation by Orenda Books, and she has been dubbed the "Icelandic Ruth Rendell" by the British press. 

Eva Björg Ægisdóttir lives and works in Reykjavík with her family.

References

Icelandic writers
1988 births
Living people
Icelandic crime fiction writers